An Jung-geun, sometimes spelled Ahn Joong-keun (2 September 1879 – 26 March 1910; baptismal name: Thomas An ), was a Korean-independence activist, nationalist, and pan-Asianist. He is famous for assassination of Itō Hirobumi, the first Prime Minister of Japan.

On 26 October 1909, he assassinated Prince Itō Hirobumi, a four-time Prime Minister of Japan, former Resident-General of Korea, and then President of the Privy Council of Japan, following Korea's compelled signing of the 1905 Eulsa Treaty, which made the Korean Empire a protectorate of the Empire of Japan. This also occurred a year before the Japan–Korea Treaty of 1910, in which Korea was formally annexed by Japan. An was imprisoned and later executed by Japanese authorities on 26 March 1910.

He was posthumously awarded the Order of Merit for National Foundation in 1962 by the South Korean government, the most prestigious civil decoration in the Republic of Korea, for his efforts for Korean independence.

Biography

Early accounts

An was born on 2 September 1879, in Haeju, Hwanghae Province, the first son of An Taehun (안태훈; 安泰勳) and Cho Maria (조마리아, 趙性女), of the Sunheung Ahn clan (순흥 안씨; 順興 安氏). Ahn is the 26th great-grandson of Ahn Hyang. The name originated from seven dots on the chest and stomach, meaning that it was born in accordance with the energy of the Big Dipper. As a boy, he learned Chinese literature and Western sciences, but was more interested in martial arts and marksmanship. Kim Gu (김구; 金九), the future leader of the Korean independence movement who had taken refuge in An Tae-hun's house at the time, wrote that young An Jung-geun was an excellent marksman, liked to read books, and had strong charisma.

At the age of 16, An entered the Catholic Church with his father, where he received his baptismal name "Thomas" (토마스), and learned French. While fleeing from the Japanese, An took refuge with a French priest of the Catholic Church in Korea named Wilhelm (Korean name,  Hong Seok-gu; 홍석구; 洪錫九) who baptized and hid him in his church for several months. The priest encouraged An to read the Bible and had a series of discussions with him. He maintained his belief in Catholicism until his death, going to the point of even asking his son to become a priest in his last letter to his wife.

At the age of 25, he started a coal business, but devoted himself to the education of Korean people after the Eulsa Treaty by establishing private schools in northwestern regions of Korea. He also participated in the National Debt Repayment Movement. In 1907 he exiled himself to Vladivostok to join in with the armed resistance against the Japanese colonial rulers, where he learned fluent Russian. He was appointed a lieutenant general of an armed Korean resistance group and led several attacks against Japanese forces before his eventual defeat.

Assassination of Itō Hirobumi

In October 1909, An passed the Imperial Japanese guards at the Harbin Railway Station. Itō Hirobumi had come back from negotiating with the Russian representative on the train. An shot him three times with an FN M1900 pistol on the railway platform. He also shot Kawagami Toshihiko (川上俊彦), the Japanese Consul General, Morita Jirō (森泰二郞), a Secretary of Imperial Household Agency, and Tanaka Seitarō (田中淸太郞), an executive of South Manchuria Railway, who were seriously injured. After the shooting, An yelled out for Korean independence in Russian, stating "Корея! Ура!" (Korea! Hurrah!), and waving the Korean flag.

Afterwards, An was arrested by Russian guards who held him for two days before turning him over to Japanese colonial authorities. When he heard the news that Itō had died, he made the sign of the cross in gratitude. An was quoted as saying, "I have ventured to commit a serious crime, offering my life for my country. This is the behavior of a noble-minded patriot." Wilhelm gave last rites to An, ignoring the bishop of Korea's order not to. An insisted that the captors call him by his baptismal name, Thomas.

In court, An claimed to be a lieutenant general of the Korean resistance army and demanded to be treated as a prisoner of war and not a suspected criminal. He insisted he did nothing wrong, reciting a list of 15 execution-worthy offenses he believed Itō had committed. An mistakenly believed Itō had ordered the assassination of Empress Myeongseong, an order which is attributed to Miura Gorō, although Miura Gorō did send a report to Itō after the execution.

Imprisonment and death
An's Japanese captors showed sympathy to him. He recorded in his autobiography that the public prosecutor, Mizobuchi Takao, exclaimed "From what you have told me, it is clear that you are a righteous man of East Asia. I can't believe a sentence of death will be imposed on a righteous man. There's nothing to worry about." He was also given New Year's delicacies and his calligraphy was highly admired and requested. After six trials, An was sentenced to death by the Japanese colonial court in Ryojun (Port Arthur). An was angered at the sentence, though he expected it. He had hoped to be viewed as a prisoner of war instead of an assassin. On the same day of sentencing at two o'clock in the afternoon, his two brothers Jeong-geun and Gong-geun met with him to deliver their mother's message, "Your death is for the sake of your country, and don't ask for your life in a cowardly manner. Your brave death for justice is final filial regard to your mother."

Judge Hirashi, who presided over An's trial, had promised An that a stay of execution for at least a few months would be granted, but Tokyo ordered prompt action. Before his execution, An made two final requests: that the wardens help him finish his essay, "On Peace in East Asia", and for a set of white silk Korean clothes to die in. The warden granted the second request and resigned shortly afterwards. An requested to be executed as a prisoner of war, by firing squad. But instead, it was ordered that he should be hanged as a common criminal. An was executed in Ryojun, on 26 March 1910. His grave in Lu Shun has not been found.

Views
Some historians hold that Itō's death resulted in the acceleration of the final stage of the colonization process, but the claim has been disputed by some.

Pan-Asianism 
An strongly believed in the union of the three great countries in East Asia, China, Korea, and Japan in order to counter and fight off Western imperialism, namely, Western countries that controlled parts of Asia, and restore East Asian independence. He followed the progress of Japan during the Russo-Japanese War and claimed that he and his compatriots were delighted at hearing of the defeat of one of the agents of western imperialism, but were disappointed that the war ended before Russia was totally subjugated.

According to Donald Keene, author of Emperor of Japan: Meiji and His World, 1852–1912, An Jung-Geun was an admirer of Emperor Meiji of Imperial Japan. One of the 15 charges An leveled against Itō was that he had deceived the Emperor of Japan, whom An felt desired peace in East Asia and Korean independence. An requested that Meiji be informed of his reasons for his execution of Itō in the hopes that if Meiji understood his reasons, the emperor would realize how mistaken Itō's policies were and would rejoice. An also felt sure that most Japanese felt similar hatred for Itō, an opinion he formed from talking with Japanese prisoners in Korea. During An's prison sentence and trial, many Japanese prison guards, lawyers, and even prosecutors were inspired by him.

An felt that with the death of Itō, Japan and Korea could become friends because of the many traditions that they shared. He hoped that this friendship, along with China, would become a model for the world to follow. His thoughts on Pan-Asianism were stated in his essay, "On Peace in East Asia" (東洋平和論; 동양평화론) that he worked on and left unfinished before his execution. In this work, An recommends the organization of combined armed forces and the issue of joint banknotes among Korea, Japan, and China. Sasagawa Norikatsu (笹川紀勝), a Professor of Law at Meiji University, highly praises An's idea as an equivalent of the European Union and a concept that preceded the concept of the League of Nations by 10 years.

Legacy

The assassination of Itō by An was praised by Koreans and many Chinese as well, who were struggling against Japanese invasion at the time. Well-known Chinese political leaders such as Yuan Shikai, Sun Yat-sen, and Liang Qichao wrote poems acclaiming An.

In the 2010 An Jung-Geun Symposium in Korea, Wada Haruki (和田春樹), an activist who once worked at Tokyo University, evaluated An by quoting Itō Yukio (伊藤之雄), a fellow history scholar in Kyoto University. In his text published in 2009, Itō Yukio claims that the reign by Itō Hirobumi resulted in strong resistance from Koreans as it was considered the first step for the annexation of Korea due to the cultural differences, and that An is not to be blamed even if he assassinated Itō without understanding Itō's ideology (2009, Itō).

On 26 March 2010, a nationwide centenary tribute to An was held in South Korea, including a ceremony led by the Prime Minister Chung Un-Chan and tribute concerts.

Ancestry 
An's family produced many other Korean independence activists. An's cousin An Myeong-Geun (안명근; 安明根) attempted to assassinate Terauchi Masatake, the first Japanese Governor-General of Korea (조선총독; 朝鮮總督) who executed the Japan-Korea Annexation Treaty in 1910. He failed, however, and was imprisoned for 15 years; he died in 1926.  An's brothers An Jeong-Geun (안정근; 安定根) and An Gong-Geun (안공근; 安恭根), as well as An's cousin An Gyeong-Geun (안경근; 安敬根) and nephew An Woo-Saeng (안우생; 安偶生), joined the Provisional Government of the Republic of Korea in Shanghai, China, which was led by Kim Gu, and fought against Japan. An Chun-Saeng (안춘생; 安春生), another nephew of An's, joined the National Revolutionary Army of China, participated in battles against Japanese forces at Shanghai, and joined the Korean Liberation Army in 1940. Later, he became a lieutenant general of the Republic of Korea Army and a member of the National Assembly of South Korea.

Meanwhile, An Jung-Geun's youngest son, Ahn Jun-Saeng (안준생;安俊生) became a prominent businessman and Chinilpa during the Japanese occupation of Korea. He died in 1952 from Tuberculosis, with his children immigrating to the United States of America after the war.

 Grandfather
 An In-su (안인수, 安仁壽)
 Father
 An Tae-hun (안태훈, 安泰勳)
 Mother 
 Jo Maria (趙瑪利亞, 조마리아) of the Baecheon Jo clan (배천 조씨) (6 May 1862 - 25 July 1927)
 Sister
 Younger sister: An Seong-nyeo (안성녀) (1881 - 1954)
 Brother
 Younger brother: An Jeong-geun (안정근, 安定根) (17 January 1887 - 17 March 1949)
 Sister-in-law: Yi Jeong-seo (이정서)
 Nephew: An Won-saeng (안원생)
 Niece: An Mi-saeng (안미생)
 Nephew: An Jin-saeng (안진생) (28 January 1916 - 24 December 1988)
 Niece-in-law: Park Tae-jeong (박태정)
 Grandniece: An Gi-su (안기수)
 Grandniece: An Gi-ryeo (안기려)
 Younger brother: An Gong-geun (안공근, 安恭根) (11 July 1889 - 30 May 1939)
 Nephew: An Woo-saeng (안우생, 安偶生) (1907 - 1997)
 Nephew: An Nak-saeng (안낙생, 安樂生) (22 June 1913 - 1950)
 Niece: Lady An
 Nephew-in-law: Han Ji-seong (한지성, 韓志成)
 Niece: Lady An
 Wife
 Kim Ah-ryeo (김아려, 金亞麗)
 Children
 Son: An Mun-saeng (안문생, 安文生)
 Daughter: An Hyeon-saeng (안현생) (1902 - 1959) 
 Son-in-law: Hwang Il-cheong (황일청)
 Granddaughter: Hwang Eun-ju (황은주)
 Granddaughter: Hwang Eun-sil (황은실)
 Son: An Jun-saeng (안준생, 安俊生) (1907 - November 1951) 
 Daughter-in-law: Jeong Ok-nyeo  (정옥녀, 鄭玉女) (1905 - ?)
 Grandson: An Ung-ho (안웅호, 雄浩)
 Granddaughter: An Yeon-ho (안연호) (1938 - 6 February 2011)
 Granddaughter: An Seon-ho (안선호) (? - 2003)
 Cousins
 An Myeong-geun (안명근,安明根) (1879 - 1927)
 An Hong-geun (안홍근)
 An Bong-geun (안봉근, 安奉根)
 Grandnephew: An Chun-saeng (안춘생, 安椿生) (12 August 1912 - 26 January 2011)

Calligraphic works 
An is highly renowned for calligraphy works. While he was in prison, many prison guards such as Chiba Toshichi (千葉十七) who respected him, made requests to An for calligraphy works.
He left many calligraphy works which were written in the jail of Lushun although he hadn't studied calligraphy formally. He would leave on his calligraphy works a signature of "大韓國人" (Great Korean) and a handprint of his left hand, which was missing the last joint of the ring finger, which he had cut off with his comrades in 1909 as a pledge to kill Itō. Some of the works were designated as Treasure No. 569 of the Republic of Korea in 1972. One of his famous works is "一日不讀書口中生荊棘" (일일부독서 구중생형극; Unless one reads every day, thorns grow in the mouth), a quote from the Analects of Confucius.

Memorial Halls
Memorial halls for An were erected in Seoul in 1970 by the South Korean government and in Harbin by the Chinese government in 2006. South Korean President Park Geun-Hye raised the idea of erecting a monument for An while meeting with Chinese President Xi Jinping during a visit to China in June 2013. Thus another memorial hall honoring An Jung-Geun was opened on Sunday, 19 January 2014 in Harbin. The hall, a 200-square meter room, features photos and memorabilia. Annual activities in memorial of An are held in Lüshun, where he was imprisoned and executed.

According to local sources in China dated on 22 March 2017, the An Jung-geun Memorial Hall located at Harbin Railway Station was recently relocated to a Korean art museum in Harbin City amid China's retaliation over South Korea's deployment of the U.S. THAAD antimissile system. The Memorial Hall has since been reopened in the Harbin Railway Station after renovation work.

Controversies 
Historically, the Japanese government has generally deemed An Jung-geun as a terrorist and criminal, while South Korea has upheld An as a national hero. In January 2014, Yoshihide Suga, then a Japanese government spokesperson and former Japanese Prime Minister, described the Harbin memorial hall honoring An in China as "not conducive to building peace and stability" between East Asian countries. China, on the other hand has declared that An was a "famous anti-Japanese high-minded person" while South Korea's foreign ministry stated An was a "highly respected figure."

In February 2017, South Korean police were criticized for using a picture of An in posters put up in the city of Incheon. The poster warned of terrorism, and many South Korean citizens online criticized the police, asking "if it was meant to imply if An was a terrorist". A police officer in the Korea Times apologized and clarified that there was no intention to associate An with terrorism, and all posters were taken down.

In popular culture
The North Korean film An Jung Gun Shoots Itō Hirobumi is a dramatized story of the event.
The South Korean film Thomas An Jung-geun (토마스 안중근) is another dramatized story of the event. Released on September 10, 2004, it is directed by Seo Se-won. An Jung-Geun is played by actor Yu Oh-seong and Itō Hirobumi is played by Yoon Joo-sang.

A Chinese-South Korean co-production, The Age of Heroes, is being planned as a Korean drama for 2019. The Age of Heroes is planned to be 24 episodes long and entirely pre-produced with a budget of 30 billion won.  Filming will begin by the end of 2018 with locations in South Korea, China, and North Korea.

A fictionalized explanation of the events is presented in an episode of the fifteenth season of The Murdoch Mysteries, a Canadian murder mystery show. In the episode, entitled Patriot Games, a dead body in a Toronto cellar leads to an explanation of An Jung-geun's assassination plot wherein rogue Russian agents play a part, requiring swift action to prevent the outbreak of a potential world war.

See also

 Korean independence movement
 Lee Bong-chang
 Yun Bong-gil

References
 Chung, K. (1910/2004). 대한계년사 9 [History of Korean Empire Vol. 9]. Seoul, South Korea: Somyung. 
 Itō, Y. (2009). 伊藤博文 近代日本を創った男 [Itō Hirobumi – A man who modernized Japan]. Tokyo, Japan: Kodansha. .
 Jansen, M. B. (1961). Sakamoto Ryoma and the Meiji Restoration. Stanford, CA: Stanford University Press. 
 Kang, J. (2007). 한국근대사산책 5 [Modern history of Korea Vol.5]. Seoul, South Korea: Inmulgwa Sasang. 
 Kim, G. (1928/1997). 백범일지 [Baekbeomilji]. Seoul, Korea: Hakminsa. 
 Nam, K. (1999). 종횡무진 동양사 [History of Eastern Asia] Seoul, South Korea: Greenbee. 
 Ravina, M. (2004). The last samurai: The life and battles of Saigo Takamori. Hoboken, NJ: John Wiley & Sons.

Notes

External links
 
 An Jung Geun Memorial Hall
 
 
 Scholarly introduction to An Jung-geun's Treatise on Peace in the East
 An Jung-geun's Treatise on Peace in the East (1910)
 Hero: the Musical, Lincoln Center, New York, 2011

1879 births
1910 deaths
People from Haeju
Korean Roman Catholics
Korean assassins
Korean expatriates in Russia
Korean independence activists
Nationalist assassins
19th-century Korean people
Recipients of the Order of Merit for National Foundation
20th-century executions by Japan
People executed by Japan by hanging
Executed Korean people
Executed assassins
Pan-Asianists
Converts to Roman Catholicism
Sunheung An clan
Korean nationalism